The 1919 Southern Branch Cubs football team represented the Southern Branch of the University of California (later known as UCLA) in the 1919 college football season. The program, which was later known as the Bruins, was in its first year of existence. The Cubs were coached by Fred Cozens, who was also the basketball coach, and finished the season with a 2–6 record, with victories over Occidental Frosh team and the Los Angeles Junior College.

Schedule

References

Southern Branch
UCLA Bruins football seasons
Southern Branch Cubs football